McLauchlan is a surname. Notable people with the surname include:

Billy McLauchlan (1950–1972), Scottish footballer
Gerry McLauchlan (born 1989), Scottish footballer
Ian McLauchlan (born 1942), Scottish rugby union player
Lee McLauchlan (born 1979), Australian hockey player
Lucy McLauchlan, English artist
Murray McLauchlan (born 1948), Canadian musician
Tracey McLauchlan (born 1979), New Zealand table tennis player
Tui McLauchlan (1915–2004), New Zealand artist